Mariana Simeanu (born 15 August 1964) is a Romanian middle-distance runner who competed in the 800 metres. Her sole international achievement was a bronze medal at the 1985 IAAF World Indoor Games, held in Paris. Her personal bests for the distance were 2:02.41 minutes outdoors, set in Rome on 31 August 1984 and 2:05.51 minutes indoors, set during her medal win.

References

Living people
1964 births
Romanian female middle-distance runners
World Athletics Indoor Championships medalists